P. R. Sudhakar Lal is an Indian businessman and political leader, Member of the Legislative Assembly of Koratagere, Tumkur district Karnataka, India. He was elected in the year 2013, defeating G. Parameshwara.

Early life and education
Sudhakar Lal P. R. born (in c. 1965) in Koratagere to P. T. Roopala Naik, he studied Mechanical Engineering at Siddaganga Institute of Technology, Tumkur and has L.L.B. (Law) Degree.

Political Career

In 1989, Sudhakar Lal P. R., joined Congress as District President (NSUI) of Tumkur. 
In 2000, he was elected as ZP Member from Holavana Halli Constitution in Koratagere.
In 2004, he left Congress for JD(s) along with K. N. Rajanna. 
In 2004, he was elected as ZP Member from Thovinakere in Koratagere as a JD(S) Member.
In 2009, he was elected as ZP Member from Huli Kunte Constitution in Koratagere.

References

Living people
Karnataka MLAs 2013–2018
People from Tumkur district
1965 births
Indian National Congress politicians from Karnataka